Alessandro Eleuteri (born 8 June 1998) is an Italian football player. He plays for  club Fermana.

Club career

Ascoli 
Born in San Benedetto del Tronto, Eleuteri started his career in Ascoli. On 6 April 2014 he made his professional debut in Serie C for Ascoli as a substitute replacing Lion Giovannini in the 86th minute of a 3–0 away win over Prato. Three week later, on 27 April he played his second match for Ascoli, again as a substitute replacing Matteo Minnozzi in the 73rd minute of a 1–0 away defeat against Gubbio.

Atalanta 
After spending 2 years in the Juventus youth team he joined to Atalanta Primavera for the second half of the 2016–17 season where he made 8 appearances.

Loan to Pistoiese and Monopoli 
On 14 July 2017, Eleuteri was signed by Serie C side Pistoiese on a season-long loan deal. On 24 September he made his Serie C debut for Pistoiese as a substitute replacing Juan Surraco in the 88th minute of a 2–0 away defeat against Livorno. In January 2018, Eleuteri returned to Atalanta leaving Pistoiese with only 9 appearances, all as a substitute.

On 23 January 2018, Eleuteri was loaned to Monopoli on a 6-month loan deal. On 8 April he made his debut in Serie C for Monopoli as a substitute replacing Leonardo Longo in the 85th minute of a 2–0 home win over Bisceglie. One week later, on 15 April he made his second appearances for Monopoli, again as a substitute replacing Leonardo Longo in the 84th minute of a 2–1 away defeat against Juve Stabia. Eleuteri ended his loan with only 2 appearances, both as a substitute.

Loan to Ravenna 
On 12 July 2018, Eleuteri was loaned to Serie C club Ravenna on a season-long loan deal.

Loan to Feralpisalò 
On 12 July 2019, he joined Serie C club Feralpisalò on loan.

Loan to Alessandria 
On 16 January 2020, he was loaned to Alessandria until the end of the season.

Vis Pesaro
On 31 August 2020, he joined Vis Pesaro on a 3-year contract.

Loan to Carpi 
On 29 January 2021, he was loaned to Carpi until the end of the 2020–21 season.

Fermana
On 19 August 2022, Eleuteri signed a two-year contract with Fermana.

Career statistics

Club

Honours

Club 
Juventus Primavera

 Torneo di Viareggio: 2016

References

External links
 

1998 births
People from San Benedetto del Tronto
Sportspeople from the Province of Ascoli Piceno
Footballers from Marche
Living people
Italian footballers
Association football defenders
Italy youth international footballers
Ascoli Calcio 1898 F.C. players
U.S. Pistoiese 1921 players
S.S. Monopoli 1966 players
Ravenna F.C. players
FeralpiSalò players
U.S. Alessandria Calcio 1912 players
Vis Pesaro dal 1898 players
A.C. Carpi players
Fermana F.C. players
Serie C players